The 1996–97 season was Galatasaray's 93rd in existence and the 39th consecutive season in the 1. Lig. This article shows statistics of the club's players in the season, and also lists all matches that the club have played in the season.

Squad statistics

Players in / out

In

Out

1. Lig

Standings

Matches

Türkiye Kupası

Sixth round

UEFA Cup Winners' Cup

First round

Second round

Süper Kupa-Cumhurbaşkanlığı Kupası
Kick-off listed in local time (EET)

1996

1997

Friendly Matches
Kick-off listed in local time (EET)

TSYD Kupası

Gurbet Kupası

Attendance

References

 Tuncay, Bülent (2002). Galatasaray Tarihi. Yapı Kredi Yayınları

External links
 Galatasaray Sports Club Official Website 
 Turkish Football Federation – Galatasaray A.Ş. 
 uefa.com – Galatasaray AŞ

Galatasaray S.K. (football) seasons
Turkish football clubs 1996–97 season
Turkish football championship-winning seasons
1990s in Istanbul
Galatasaray Sports Club 1996–97 season